"Undivided Love" is a song by British singer Louise, released as the fourth single from her debut album, Naked (1996). Released on 19 August 1996, the song charted at number five in the United Kingdom and number 13 in Ireland. The song's music video was directed by Randee St. Nicholas.

Critical reception
Jon O'Brien from AllMusic described the song as "'80s-sounding", adding that it repeated the trick of "Naked".

Track listings

 UK CD1
 "Undivided Love"
 "Undivided Love" (T-Empo vocal)
 "Undivided Love" (T-Empo dub)
 "Undivided Love" (Tin Tin Out mix)
 "Undivided Love" (Studio 54 mix)

 UK CD2
 "Undivided Love" (single mix)
 "How in the World"
 "Better Next Time"

 UK cassette single
 "Undivided Love" – 3:47
 "Undivided Love" (T-Empo vocal) – 7:38
 "Undivided Love" (Tin Tin Out mix) – 8:20
 "Undivided Love" (Studio 54 mix) – 6:12

 European CD single
 "Undivided Love"
 "How in the World"

Charts

References

Louise Redknapp songs
1996 singles
1996 songs
EMI Records singles
First Avenue Records singles
Music videos directed by Randee St. Nicholas
Songs written by Simon Climie
Songs written by Denis Ingoldsby
Songs written by Oliver Smallman